Gashi is an Albanian surname and the name of one of the major historical tribes of northern Albania. It is a historical tribal region situated in the Highlands of Gjakova. The Gashi tribe is known to follow the Kanuni i Malësisë së Madhë, a variant of the Kanun. They were known among the mountain tribes for their wisdom.

Geography
Gashi is one of the most widespread Albanian tribes in northern Albania, Kosovo and Macedonia. Their tribal territory corresponds to the District of Tropoja and District of Gjakova in Albania and Kosovo respectively; it extends from the east of the town of Bajram Curri to villages such as Botushë and Koshare in Kosovo. Their tribal region is based on the valleys of the Llugaj and Bushtrica rivers, bordering the Krasniqi to the west, the Bytyçi to the south over the Luzha Pass (Qafa e Luzhës), and the Morina (tribe) to the southeast. The Gashi tribe also held summer pasturelands to the north of the mountain east of Vuthaj.

Origins
The Gashi are centred in the historical region of the Highlands of Gjakova (Albanian: Malësia e Gjakovës), which spans the District of Tropojë in Albania and the Gjakova Municipality in Kosovo. They are thought to be related to the Toplana. According to tradition, recorded by Baron Nopcsa in 1907, the ancestor of Shllaku was named "Can Gabeti", one of four brothers (the others were the founder of the Gashi, Toplana and Megulla). The four brothers lived in the Shllaku region where they divided up their possessions. The Gashi and Toplana eventually moved eastwards, with the Gashi first settling in Serma between the Nikaj and Leshnica rivers. Their settlement in Serma was short-lived, and they moved to their current location at around 1660 after Catholic members of the tribe killed 2 imams. Begolli Bey of Peja had his troops surround the tribe and force them to move to a new region (the Highlands of Gjakova) where the native population called Anas lived. The title 'Anas' is used in several Albanian tribal historiographies, as it is an Albanian term that refers to the indigenous peoples of a region. Anas does not refer to Slavic populations. Gabeti, said to have been an Orthodox Christian from Montenegro, came across the original native population who were the ancestors of the Kolë Pep Fura family and whose last male descendant died about 1900. Baron Nopsca believes that the Gashi separated from the Toplana and Shllaku tribes at around 1524 or possibly somewhat earlier, probably as a result of the first Ottoman war in Albania. However, the alleged connection with Toplana and Shllaku is not supported by genetic results, which indicate that the Toplana and Shllaku are related to one another but do not have blood ties with the Gashi.

Nonetheless, the Gashi are thought to have been the first tribe in the region of Tropoja, i.e. before the Krasniqja. Historical reference is made to another ancestral father of the Gashi called Leka, the son of Pjetër Spani, who lived in the settlement of Selimaj (Gegëhysen) in the second half of the fifteenth century. What is clear, however, is that the Gashi were traditionally composed of 3 main brotherhoods or smaller tribes:
 The Luzha, mainly inhabitants of Botushë and Luzha who hail from the original Gashi of Pult that date back to the 16th century. 
 The Bardhi/Bardhaj, who settled the Gjakova Highlands in the early 17th century at the latest.
 The Shipshani, who settled the Gjakova highlands from the beginning of the 17th century.

According to local legend, the Gashi tribe took its current form when the Aga of the Gashi in Botushë united the Luzha with the bajrak of Bardhi and Shipshan as a protective measure against the surrounding tribes who were bigger in number.

History
Gashi as a patronym is attested in the Ottoman defter of 1485 in the settlement of Bazari Lepoviça in the nahiye of Petrishpan-ili. The settlement had thirty households; amongst them were: Mrija, son of Gashi and Nikolla, son of Gashi. 
According to Robert Elsie, the first mention of this tribe in historical documents was in 1634 as Gaasi in the ecclesiastical report of the Franciscan priest Bonaventura di Palazzolo. Robert Elsie emphasized that Gashi were first northern Albanian tribe that lived in the region of Tropojë. 

The Gashi tribe and their origins were documented during a visit from Frang Bardhi to the villages of Pult in 1638; Bardhi recorded the village of Gash as having 97 houses and 866 Christian inhabitants. He stated that the every household belonged to the Gashi, and that 95 people held the surname of Gashi. At this point in time, the Gashi could trace their ancestors to the fourth generation.

The Gashi tribe were continuously documented throughout the 17th century, when Gashi was the centre of the Diocese of Pult. Reports indicated that the Gashi and Krasniqja tribes were in frequent conflicts with one another until 1680, when Pjetër Bogdani managed to reconcile 24 blood feuds between the two tribes. In 1689, Gashi tribal leaders wrote a letter to the Vatican, asking for greater clerical and material support. This letter is one of the oldest documents in the Albanian language.  During the Austro-Turkish War of 1683-1699, the Gashi and the other Catholic tribes of the area supported the Austrians, and were therefore punished by the Ottomans after the defeat of the Austrians. In the years 1690-1693, the village of Gash was burned down by the Pasha of Peja and its population was expelled to the Llap region in Kosovo. Nonetheless, some families either returned to their original territories or escaped persecution, as in 1693-1697, the Gash villages of Luzhë and Botushë appear in documents. In 1716, the Gashi tribe, along with the Kelmendi, Pult, Shala and Mirdita tribal regions, were targeted by a punitive operation carried out by Tahir Pasha of Dukagjin.

In May 1845, following Reşid Pasha's outlawing of the right to bear arms, the Gashi tribe, along with 2,000 people from the Gjakova region as well as the Gjakova Highlander tribes of Krasniqi and Bytyçi, rose in revolt. The rebels, numbering to about 8,000 men, drove the Ottoman garrison out of Gjakova. The Ottomans suppressed the rebellion, but did not succeed in establishing effective control of the region. In 1862, the Ottomans sent Maxharr Pasha with 12 divisions to implement the Tanzimat Reforms in the Highlands of Gjakova. Under the leadership of Mic Sokoli and Binak Alia, the Gashi, Krasniqi, Bytyçi and Nikaj-Mertur tribes organized a resistance near Bujan. The rebels were reinforced by the forces of Shala, led by Mark Lula. After heavy fighting, they managed to defeat the Ottoman force and expel them from the highlands. The Gashi tribe, led by Ali Ibra and Haxhi Brahimi, participated in the Battle of Nokshiq in Montenegro, in which the Albanian League of Prizren defeated a numerically superior Montenegrin force.

Sulejman Aga Batusha of Botushë was a chief of the Gashi tribe and was their leader in the Gjakova region during the early 20th century, participating in many uprisings against the Ottoman Empire.

During the Albanian uprising of 1912, the Gashi tribe joined the Krasniqi tribe (led by Bajram Curri) as well as the Hasi and Bytyqi tribes in the battle of Prush Pass, near the Has region, where the Ottomans had left a garrison of four battalions. A bloody battle ensured, resulting in a heavy defeat for the Ottoman Turks, which left the rebels with much ammunition, arms, machine guns and cannons. There were many casualties for the Turks; hundreds of dead, wounded and prisoners of war. The prisoners of war were disarmed and released, and were told that the uprising was an attempt to free Albanian and Anatolian peasants from oppression in order to deceive them - they were surprised and had believed what they were told, and had virtually demoralised the Gjakova's entire garrison upon their return to the town. This battle improved the morale of the Albanians in their movement for independence.

Gashi Brotherhoods
The Gashi were traditionally composed of three brotherhoods in the Highlands of Gjakova - the Luzha, Bardhi/Bardhajt and the Shipshani; the Luzha were not blood-related to the Bardhi and Shipshani upon their initial formation as the Gashi tribe.

Luzha
According to legend, there are two villages (Luzha and Botusha) in the Highlands of Gjakova where the Albanian population of the older Gashi tribe of the 17th century continues to live. Due to their constant resistance against Ottoman rule, the Gashi tribe were repeatedly punished via military expeditions, which led to the departure of the population from their initial settlements and a gradual conversion to Islam in the years 1690-1743. Luzha's current inhabitants remember their ancestors up to 15 generations, of which the first 3-4 have Catholic names, while the rest are Muslim.Even in Botusha and Deçan, about 10-11 generations with Muslim names are remembered, while the previous generations with Catholic names. Both Luzha and Botusha are mentioned by Catholic priests who visited some villages beyond the Diocese of Pult in 1693-1694. In 1697, Luzha itself is mentioned as a village of 12 Catholic homes, and as a seed in the tribe of the Gashi. With the gradual abandonment of the old village of Gash, a large part of the inhabitants moved to different parts of Kosovo, while a part managed to stay in the Gjakova Highlands within the villages of Luzhë and Botushë.

Bardhi/Bardhaj
The Bardhi/Bardhaj who populated the area between the Gashi River and the Tropoja River are considered to be the descendants of an Albanian called Bardh Aga, who had three sons - Brahim, Ali and Memi Bardhi. These three brothers - who according to generational calculations may have lived about 400 years ago - were Muslims. In a report of 1698, the Bardhaj are already mentioned as a tribe and distributed amongst 68 households in 4 villages on the Valbona river. They consisted of many Catholic women, but the men were all Muslim. They were initially a distinct tribe separate from the Gashi tribe, both in name and religion (as the Gashi were still mainly Catholic at this time). There are several different legends about their origin, but the one collected by Rrok Zojzi is one of the main theories; this legend states that Bardh Aga came from Kuçi, an originally-Albanian tribe in Montenegro who have since been assimilated by the Slavs, and another one states that the Bardhi came from Kosovo. Bardh Aga was said to have settled with his sons in the are of Gosturan, which is where the Bardhi/Bardhajt still live today.

Shipshani 
The Shipshani are a component of the Gashi tribe that live in the area between the Tropoja River and the Morina Pass. According to legend, the Shipshani are descendants of the Albanian Kall Kamberi, who had 3 sons - Gegë, Buçë and Papë Kalla - who lived about 14-15 generations ago. The geographical origin of the three brothers is not completely certain, but it is known that Gegaj, Buçaj and Papaj are settlements of the Shipshani, and that the first two generations of the tribe were of the Catholic faith. Based on the calculation of generations, it can be assumed that the spread of the Shipshani in today's territory began in the 17th century. 

Another mention from the oral tradition is that Kall Kamberi worked for the Zaim of the Gashi -- in this case, Ali Bardhi (son of Bardhi). Kall Kamberi, now widowed, married Ali Bardhi's daughter. Since Shipshan was part of Ali Bardhi's Zeamet of Altun-ili, he sent the couple there to live.

Distribution

Apart from their nucleus in Highlands of Gjakova, brotherhoods and families stemming from the Gashi tribe are found in traditionally Albanian-inhabited territories in Kosovo, Serbia, North Macedonia and northern Albania. The Gashi tribe is present in every province of Kosovo. Some families identify as Gash i Gurit, while others identify as Gash. Many of the Gashi family in Kosovo preserve memories and origins from the Gjakova Highlands, such as in the villages of Carrabreg, Dobërdol in Besiana, Kryshec, Llapashticë e Eperme, Llapashticë e Poshtme, Llausha, Lubovec, Mramor in Prishtina, Radishevë etc. Among the oldest data on the presence of the Gashi in Kosovo is the aforementioned report from 1697, which states: “The village of Gashi with 120 houses, which were evicted from Pasha of Peja, are now located in the area of Kosovo, in a place called Llap, who are living there for 8 years, which are without priests and have begun to become Turkish (Muslim) and schismatic due to the lack of Catholic priests". Nonetheless, many other Gashi families in Kosovo do not have a tradition of descent from the Highlands of Gjakova. In some cases, families have forgotten their origins over the centuries, but in many cases, Albanian families who have historically inhabited Kosovo prior to the arrival of the Gashi tribe and joined them thereafter mistakenly claim descent from the tribe. Therefore, the Gashi tribal affiliation of Albanian families in Kosovo is not necessarily related to origins in northern Albania and could very well be local Albanian families that may in fact originate in Kosovo.

Relations with other tribes
Gashi tribe was in conflict with Shala tribe until they made peace in August 1879, based on sultan's order. The Gashi tribe regarded themselves as related to the Krasniqi in the sense that they both came from the west, and Baron Nopcsa recorded that the Gashi were originally related to the Toplana.

Settlements

 Ahmataj (Shushicë-Ahmataj)
 Babina
 Begaj
 Berbat (Shkëlzen)
 Botushë
 Buçin
 Degë
 Dushaj
 Gegaj
 Gri
 Kernaja
 Kovaç
 Luzha
 Mejdan
 Papaj
 Rajë
 Selimaj (Gegëhysen)
Tropoja

Notable People
 Vjosa Osmani, current President of Kosovo
 Shote Galica, guerilla fighter
 Sulejman Aga Batusha, resistance fighter and revolutionary leader of the Albanian National Awakening
 Sylejman Selimi, commander of KLA, politician
 Jashar Salihu, Hero of Kosovo recipient, Albanian diplomat, activist and general
 Ibrahim Gashi, Kosovar Albanian academic and philosopher
 Shkelzen Gashi, professional footballer
 Gashi, Albanian-American rapper
 Mother Teresa, Saint

References

Sources 

 
 
 

Albanian-language surnames